TXAA or TxAA can refer to:

 Temporal anti-aliasing
 Transmit Antenna Array, used in beamforming